Yael Naim is the self-titled second studio album by Yael Naim, released on 22 October 2007 worldwide and on 18 March 2008 in North America. It features the single "New Soul", which gained widespread popularity after being featured in Apple's MacBook Air video advertisement. Some editions credit the album to both Naim and co-producer David Donatien, with some also adding Donatien's name to the cover in smaller text below Naim's.

Release
The album was released in Naim's native France in October 2007. It was made available as an iTunes digital download worldwide but only gained widespread popularity in February 2008 when the song "New Soul" was featured in advertisements for the MacBook Air computer. Largely due to the popularity of the advert and the substantial airplay of the song, the album debuted at number 15 in Canada and 55 in the United States when it was released in March 2008.

Singles
"Toxic" (Britney Spears cover) – No. 35 Spain
"New Soul" – No. 1 Belgium, No. 2 France, No. 4 Germany, No. 7 United States, Canada and Spain
"Too Long" – No. 17 Belgium Ultratip

Commercial performance
The self-titled album Yael Naim debuted at number 55 on the Billboard 200 albums chart on the week of April 5, 2008, eventually rising to number 50.

Track listing

Personal
 Ilan Abou – double bass
 Jean-Philippe Audin – cello
 Noam Burg – acoustic guitar, electric guitar
 Laurent David – bass guitar, electric guitar
 Cathy Dennis – composer, lyricist
 David Donatien – arranger, artistic director, bass, drums, electric guitar, engineer, kalimba, organ, percussion, producer, programming, string concept, synthesizer, udu, ukulele  
 Julien Feltin – acoustic guitar, electric guitar
 S. "Husky" Höskulds – mastering, mixing
 Henrik Jonback – composer
 C. Karlsson – composer, lyricist
 Kid with No Eyes – vocals
 Alexandre Kinn – Weissenborn
 Sebastien Llado – trombone
 Yael Naim – vocals, arranger, composer, producer, lyricist, engineer, programming, bass, bells, choir / chorus, drawing, Fender Rhodes, flute, acoustic guitar, electric guitar, melodica, organ, piano, string arrangements, string concept, synthesizer
 Yoed Nir – cello, string concept
 Virna Nova – acoustic guitar
 Fanny Rome – trombone, violin
 Laurent Seroussi – artwork, photography
 Stanislas Steiner – violin
 Xavier Tribolet – drums
 Clement Verzi – composer, lyricist
 Anne Warin – composer, lyricist
 Petter Winnberg – composer

Charts

Weekly charts

Year-end charts

Certifications

References

2007 albums
Yael Naim albums